is a Japanese actor and voice actor. He graduated from the Horikoshi High School.

Filmography

Films
Tales of the Unusual (2000), Ōishi Chikara
All About Lily Chou-Chou (2001), Hitoshi Terawaki
Yume Oikakete (2003), Junichi
Battle Royale II (2003), Haruya Sakurai
Hanging Garden (2005), Morisaki
Aegis (2005), Kou Kisaragi
A Heartful of Love (2005), Teruyoshi Fukawa
Origin: Spirits of the Past (2006) (voice), Agito
Hana yori mo naho (2006), Sōemon Aoki
Kōfuku na Shokutaku (2007), Bengaku Ōura
Tokyo Tower: Mom and Me, and Sometimes Dad (2007), Hiraguri
Kisshō Tennyo (2007), Ryō Tōno
Awa Dance (2007), Kōji Tachibana
The Shōnen Merikensack] (2009), Masaru
Waiting for Good News (2009), Wataru Niigaki
The Shock Labyrinth (2009), Motoki
Mobile Suit Gundam 00 The Movie: A wakening of the Trailblazer (2010) (voice), Descartes Shaman
Surely Someday (2010), Kyōhei Manabe
Hankyū Densha (2011), Keiichi Kosaka
Ogawa no Hotori (2011), Shinzō
Kita no Kanaria Tachi (2012), Naoki Ikushima
Reunion (Asu e no Tōkakan) (2013), Yūta Oikawa
Kodomo Keisatsu (2013), Shin Kunimitsu
Crows Explode (2014), Kenichi Ogisu
The Vancouver Asahi (2014), Kei Kitamoto
Eating Women (2018), Shiraishi
Gintama 2 (2018), Shige Shige Tokugawa
Masquerade Hotel (2019)
Silent Tokyo (2020)
Underdog (2020), Shun Miyaki
Nemesis: The Movie (2023), Takahiro "Taka" Chikuma

TV dramas
Eien no Ko (NTV, 2000), Shōichirō Nagase
Maria (TBS, 2001), Toshiya Takahara
Ninjo Shigure Machi (NHK, 2001), Senkichi
Sayonara, Ozu-sensei (Fuji TV, 2001), Kenta Nagase
Mōdōken Quill no Isshō (NHK, 2003), Masaharu Miyata
The Eldest Boy and His Three Elder Sisters (TBS, 2003), Kenichi Yoneyama
Stand Up!! (TBS, 2003), Yoshiki Matzuzaki
It was Sudden, Like a Storm... (TBS, 2004), Keisuke Kase
The Pride of the Temp(Haken no Hinkaku) (NTV, 2007), Tsutomu Asano
Atsuhime (NHK, 2008), John Manjirō
Mirai Kōshi Meguru (TV Asahi, 2008), Yūki Ebisawa
Cat Street (NHK, 2008), Kōichi Mine
4 Lies (TV Asahi, 2008), Eiji Anjō
Tokyo Dogs (Fuji TV, 2009), Keiichi Horikawa
Mioka: Kimi ga Ita Hibi (NTV, 2010), Kunihiko Kasagi
Rebound (NTV, 2011), Kensaku Kazami
Summer Nude (Fuji TV, 2013), Yaino Takashi
Amachan (NHK, 2013), Toshiya
Yae no Sakura (NHK, 2013), Yamakawa Kenjirō
Gekitsui 3-nin no Pilot (NHK, 2014), Kaneyoshi Mutō
Tokyo ni Olympic o Yonda Otoko (Fuji TV, 2014), Shiro Hashizume
Sutekina Sen Taxi (KTV, 2014), Yōhei Asakura
Yamegoku: Yakuza Yamete Itadakimasu (TBS, 2015), Naomichi Sano
Kizuna: Hashire Kiseki no Kouma   (NHK, 2017), Natsuo
Idaten (NHK, 2019), Hidenobu Mikawa
Nemesis (NTV, 2021), Takahiro "Taka" Chikuma

TV films
Live for this Love (TBS, 2005)
Sukoshi wa, Ongaeshi ga Dekitakana (TBS, 2006)
Satomi Hakkenden (TBS, 2006)
Papa no Namida de Ko wa Sodatsu (Fuji TV, 2007)
Kurobe no Taiyo (Fuji TV, 2009)
America ni Makenakatta Otoko (TV Tokyo, 2020), Kiichi Miyazawa
Shimura Ken to Drif no Daibakushō Monogatari (Fuji TV, 2021), Cha Katō

Anime television series
Un-Go (2011), Yuki Shinjuro

Video games
Drag-On Dragoon 2: Fuin no kurenai, haitoku no kuro (2005) (voice: Japanese version) - Nowe

Japanese dubbing
Power Rangers (2017), Jason Scott/Red Ranger (Dacre Montgomery)

Recognitions
 29th Japan Academy Film Prize: Best Newcomer for Aegis (2006)

References

External links
Agency profile  
 
Ryo Katsuji TV appearances 

JDorama.com
Dorama.info
Ryo Katsuji - NipponCinema

Living people
1986 births
Horikoshi High School alumni
Male actors from Tokyo
Japanese male television actors
Japanese male film actors
Japanese male voice actors
Japanese male child actors
21st-century Japanese male actors